Riechheimer Berg is a Verwaltungsgemeinschaft ("collective municipality") in the district Ilm-Kreis, in Thuringia, Germany. The seat of the Verwaltungsgemeinschaft is in Osthausen-Wülfershausen.

The Verwaltungsgemeinschaft Riechheimer Berg consists of the following municipalities:

Alkersleben 
Bösleben-Wüllersleben 
Dornheim 
Elleben 
Elxleben 
Osthausen-Wülfershausen 
Witzleben

References

Verwaltungsgemeinschaften in Thuringia